The 2018 European 10 m Events Championships took place in Audi Aréna, Győr, Hungary from 16 to 26 February 2018.

Men's events

Women's events

Mixed events

Men's junior events

Women's junior events

Mixed junior events

Men's youth events

Women's youth events

Medal table

See also
 European Shooting Confederation
 International Shooting Sport Federation
 List of medalists at the European Shooting Championships
 List of medalists at the European Shotgun Championships

References

External links
Profile at the European Shooting Confederation
Results Book

European Shooting Championships
European Shooting Championships
2018 European Shooting Championships
European 10 m Events Championships
Sport in Győr
European Shooting Championships